Raju Lama (born 16 March 1978) is a Nepalese singer-songwriter. He is the main singer of the musical band Mongolian Heart. His work involves songs in Nepali, Tibetan, Tamang and other languages. Lama is currently based in the US and Nepal. He is one of the coaches in The Voice of Nepal.

Albums 
Soltini – 1995
Mongolian Heart – 1996
Mongolian Heart Vol 2 – 1999
Mongolian Heart Vol 3 – 2002
Mongolian Heart Solid Gold – 2004
Donbo Tamang Album – 2004
Mongolian Heart Vol 4 – 2006
Mongolian Heart vol 5 – 2009
Mongolian Heart Vol 6 – 2012
Samling Gompa – 2016
Mongolian Heart Vol 7 – 2018

Awards 
Sajjan Smriti pop song competition Winner Band (Nepal) – 1996
Best Vocal (Nepal) – 1996
Best Composition (Nepal) – 1996
Music Nepal Gold Medal (Nepal) – 1999
Highest Selling Album of the Year (Nepal): Hits FM Awards 2002
Best performance by group or duo with vocal (Nepal): Aha Pop Music Award 2002
Best performance by group or duo with vocal (Nepal): Music Nepal Award 2002–2003
Highest selling album of the year (Nepal): Kantipur FM Annual Award 2002, 2003, 2004 & 2005
Most aired song (Nepal): Image Award 2007

Social work
Lama has volunteered to help the victim of the recent flood in Sindhupalchowk. 

On May 16, 2022, he reached the summit of Mt. Everest (8,848.86 m). Titled ‘Raju Lama Everest Expedition, the climb was to raise awareness about climate change and impacts of global warming. He also called for the reduction of carbon emissions and how it’s directly affecting the lives of people living in the mountains. As a part of this expedition, he also performed a solo concert ‘Music for a Cause’ between Camp 2 and Camp 3 at 6574m, which was probably the highest performance on the land ever.

References

1978 births
Living people
People from Sindhupalchowk District
21st-century Nepalese male singers
20th-century Nepalese male singers
Nepalese folk singers
Nepalese pop singers
Nepalese songwriters
Tibetan-language singers
Tamang-language singers
Nepali-language lyricists
Tamang people
People from Bagmati Province
Nepalese summiters of Mount Everest